The Aconcagua River is a river in Chile that rises from the conflux of two minor tributary rivers at  above sea level in the Andes, Juncal River from the east (which rise in the Nevado Juncal) and Blanco River from the south east.

The Aconcagua River valley was used as the route of the Transandine Railway on the Chilean side.  The river flows alongside Chile Route 5 from Llaillay to La Calera. For much of their lengths, the two separate stretches of Chile Route 60 follow the course of the river.

Tributaries
Colorado River
Estero Pocuro
Putaendo River
Estero Quilpué
Estero Catemu
Estero Los Loros
Estero Los Litres
Estero Limache

References

Niemeyer, Hans; Cereceda, Pilar (1983), Geografía de Chile — Tomo VIII: Hidrografía, 1º edición, Santiago de Chile: Instituto Geográfico Militar.
Gobierno de Chile, Ministerio de Obras Públicas, Dirección General de Aguas (2004) Cuenca del Río Aconcagua, Diagnóstico y Clasificación de los Cursos y Cuerpos de Agua Según Objetivos de Calidad

External links

  Aconcagua River Map

Rivers of Chile
Rivers of Valparaíso Region
Venues of the 2023 Pan and Parapan American Games